Sun Jinsheng (born 1 January 1965) is a Chinese drilling engineer who is a researcher at the China National Petroleum Corporation and a professor of China University of Petroleum, and an academician of the Chinese Academy of Engineering.

Biography
Sun was born in Yudu County, Jiangxi, on 1 January 1965. In 1981, he attended Jiangxi Normal University where he received his bachelor's degree in chemistry in 1985. After completing his master's degree in organic chemistry at Nankai University, he attended Southwest Petroleum University where he obtained his doctor's degree in applied chemistry in 2006.

Sun was despatched to PetroChina Exploration and Development Research Institute as an engineer in 1988, what he was promoted to senior engineer in 1995 and to deputy director in 2006. In August 2016, he was hired as a professor of China University of Petroleum.

Honours and awards
 2009 State Science and Technology Progress Award (Second Class)
 2012 State Science and Technology Progress Award (Second Class)
 2013 Science and Technology Innovation Award of the Ho Leung Ho Lee Foundation
 2014 Foreign Member of the Russian Academy of Natural Sciences
 2014 Foreign Member of the Russian Academy of Engineering
 2016 State Technological Invention Award (Second Class)
 27 November 2017 Member of the Chinese Academy of Engineering (CAE)

References

1965 births
Living people
People from Yudu County
Engineers from Jiangxi
Jiangxi Normal University alumni
Nankai University alumni
Southwest Petroleum University alumni
Academic staff of China University of Petroleum
Members of the Chinese Academy of Engineering
Foreign Members of the Russian Academy of Natural Sciences